Tianjin Airlines serves the following destinations (as of October 2016) under its own airline code and branding:

List

References

Lists of airline destinations